The Temporary Relief Act also known as the Soup Kitchen Act was an Act of the Parliament of the United Kingdom passed in February 1847. The Act allowed the establishment of soup kitchens in Ireland to relieve pressure from the overstretched Poor Law system, which could not adequately feed people suffering from the Great famine.

See also
Irish Poor Laws

References

Irish Poor Laws
United Kingdom Acts of Parliament 1847
1847 in Ireland
Acts of the Parliament of the United Kingdom concerning Ireland